Lauren Benton (born 1956) is an American historian known for her works on the history of empires, colonial and imperial law, and the history of international law. She is the Barton M. Biggs Professor of History and Professor of Law at Yale University.

Biography
Lauren Benton was born in 1956 in Baltimore, Maryland, and attended high school at the Park School of Baltimore in Brooklandville, Maryland. She graduated from Harvard University and received a Ph.D. in Anthropology and History from Johns Hopkins University in 1987. 

Benton’s early scholarship focused on culture and economic development. Her book Invisible Factories: The Informal Economy and Industrial Development in Spain examined industrial restructuring and the “informal sector,” or underground economy, in Spain during the transition to democracy of the 1970s and early 1980s.[5] Benton also co-edited a volume with Alejandro Portes and Manuel Castells on the informal sector in comparative economic development.[6]

Benton was professor of history at New York University and professor of history and law at Vanderbilt University before moving to Yale. She served s Dean for Humanities and Dean of the Graduate School of Arts and Science at New York University, and as Dean of the College of Arts and Science at Vanderbilt University. 

In 2019, Benton received the Toynbee Prize for significant contributions to global history.

Research

Benton's book Law and Colonial Cultures: Legal Regimes in World History, 1400-1900 mapped a novel perspective centered on the study of jurisdictional conflicts in colonial societies. Introducing the term “jurisdictional politics,” Benton analyzed the impact of colonial legal conflicts on global legal regimes, state formation, and the rise of the modern international order.[7] In 2003, Law and Colonial Cultures was awarded the World History Association's Jerry Bentley Book Prize[8] and the James Willard Hurst Book Prize.[9]

Benton's book A Search for Sovereignty: Law and Geography in European Empires, 1400-1900 showed that empires did not seek to control vast overseas territories but instead used various legal practices to claim and rule a patchwork of enclaves and corridors. A Search for Sovereignty introduced the term “legal posturing” to describe attempts by imperial agents, including pirates, to show that they were serving the interests of sovereign sponsors. The book also traced the influence of legal conflicts in European empires on definitions of sovereignty and other elements of early international law.[10]

Rage for Order: The British Empire and the History of International Law, 1800-1850, which Benton coauthored with Lisa Ford, appeared in 2016 and uncovers a vast project of global legal reform in the early nineteenth century. Benton and Ford introduce the terms "middle power" and "vernacular constitutionalism" in tracing the efforts of British imperial officials and reformers to reimagine and remake the imperial constitution. The book also analyzes the way imperial law prefigured international law and the rise of the interstate order.

Benton continues to investigate historical processes of regional and global ordering. Her work connects the study of empires and the history of international law and focuses on what Benton calls "global legal politics." She developed the term "interpolity law" to refer to global patterns of legal interactions in eras before the rise and proliferation of nation-states.

Selected published works
Books
 Lauren Benton, Bain Atwood, and Adam Clulow, eds, Protection and Empire: A Global History, Cambridge University Press, 2017.
 Lauren Benton; Lisa Ford (3 October 2016). Rage for Order: The British Empire and the Origins of International Law, 1800–1850. Harvard University Press. .
 
 
 
 
 Alejandro Portes, Manuel Castells, and Lauren Benton, eds., The Informal Economy: Studies in Advanced and Less Developed Countries (Baltimore: Johns Hopkins University Press, 1989).

Selected Articles
 “Beyond Anachronism: Histories of International Law and Global Legal Politics,” in Journal of the History of International Law (January, 2019), 1-34.
 “The Legal Logic of Wars of Conquest: Truces and Betrayal in the Early Modern World,” 28 Duke Journal of Comparative & International History (2018):425-448.
 “The Space of Political Community and the Space of Authority” Global Intellectual History, 3.2 (2018): 254-265. 
 Lauren Benton and Lisa Ford, “Island Despotism: Trinidad, the British Imperial Constitution, and Global Legal Order,” Journal of Imperial and Commonwealth History, 2017 (http://www.tandfonline.com/doi/abs/10.1080/03086534.2017.1379671)
 “Shadows of Sovereignty: Legal Encounters and the Politics of Protection in the Atlantic World,” in Alan Karras and Laura Mitchell (eds.), Encounters Old and New in World History: Essays Inspired by Jerry H. Bentley (University of Hawaii Press, 2017), 136-150.
 “Empires and Protection: Making Interpolity Law in the Early Modern World,” with Adam Clulow, Journal of Global History, 12:1: 74–92.
 “Legal Encounters and the Origins of Global Law,” with Adam Clulow, in Jerry Bentley, Sanjay Subrhahmanyam, and Merry Wiesner-Hanks (eds.), Cambridge History of the World, 2015, Vol. 6Part II, 80-100.
 “This Melancholy Labyrinth: The Trial of Arthur Hodge and the Boundaries of Imperial Law,” Alabama Law Review (2012): 100-1222. 
 "Possessing Empire: Iberian Claims and Interpolity Law," in Saliha Bellmessous, ed., Native Claims: Indigenous Law Against Empire, Oxford University Press (2011):19-40.
 “Abolition and Imperial Law, 1780-1820,” Journal of Commonwealth and Imperial History, 39:3, (2011): 355-374.
 "Toward a New Legal History of Piracy: Maritime Legalities and the Myth of Universal Jurisdiction," International Journal of Maritime History XXIII, 1 (2011): 1-15.
 “Acquiring Empire by Law: From Roman Doctrine to Early Modern European Practice,” with Benjamin Straumann, Law and History Review 28:1 (2010): 1-38.
 “From International Law to Imperial Constitutions: The Problem of Quasi-Sovereignty, 1870-1900,” Law and History Review 26:3 (2008): 595-620.
 “Legal Spaces of Empire: Piracy and the Origins of Ocean Regionalism,” in Comparative Studies in Society and History, 47:4 (2005): 700-724.
 "From the World Systems Perspective to Institutional World History: Culture and Economy in Global Theory." Journal of World History 7:2 (1996): 261-95.

Awards
 2019 Toynbee Prize
 2003 World History Association Jerry Bentley Book Award
 2003 James Willard Hurst Prize

References

External links
 https://toynbeeprize.org/2019-winner-lauren-benton/ Toynbee Prize
 Humanity Journal - Of Pirates, Empire, and Terror: An Interview With Lauren Benton and Dan Edelstein
 Harvard International Law Journal - Book Review: Law and Colonial Cultures: Legal Regimes in World History, 1400–1900

1956 births
Harvard University alumni
New York University faculty
Living people
Vanderbilt University faculty
Vanderbilt University Law School faculty
21st-century American historians
World historians